Cleve Andrew Pulley (born May 5, 1951), better known as Andrew Pulley, is an American former politician who ran as Socialist Workers Party (SWP) nominee for Vice President of the United States in 1972 and one of three nominees the party put forth for President of the United States in 1980.

Pulley was also the SWP's nominee for mayor of Chicago in 1979.

Pulley has also run for United States congress in the state of Michigan.

Biography
Pulley is African American. He is from Chicago, Illinois.

Pulley was a civil rights movement supporter, steel mill worker and Vietnam War U.S. Army veteran who had opposed the war. Pulley's speech at the April 24, 1971 500,000 person protest march in Washington, D.C. against the Vietnam War appears in filmmaker David Loeb Weiss' 1972 documentary short film, To Make a Revolution. Pulley was one of the Fort Jackson Eight. Pulley was a member of United Steelworkers Local 1066 at Gary Works.

In 1972, he was the Socialist Workers Party nominee for vice president in 1972, the running mate of Linda Jenness. He and Jenness were nominated at the party's convention in Cleveland, which was held in August 1971. At the time of the election, he was twenty years old, making him ineligible to serve as vice president under the United States Constitution (also ineligible was Jenness, who was 30). The ticket of Jenness and him received 52,799 votes.

In 1979, Pulley ran for mayor of Chicago as the SWP nominee. He received 1.83% of the vote.

In some states, he was the SWP nominee for president in 1980. As the party's presidential nominee in the states of California, Colorado, Delaware, Georgia, Kentucky, Mississippi, New Jersey, New Mexico, and South Dakota, he received a total of 6,272 votes nationwide. Among those supporting his candidacy was future-Senator Bernie Sanders.

In 1984, Pulley was the SWP nominee for Michigan's 1st congressional district, and received 0.4% of the vote. A central part of his platform was opposition to the privatization of Wayne County General Hospital.

In 1990, Pulley ran without any party affiliation for Michigan's 13th congressional district. He placed fifth out of five candidates, with 530 votes (0.8% of votes cast).

References

1951 births
Living people
African-American candidates for Vice President of the United States
African-American candidates for President of the United States
American anti–Vietnam War activists
Socialist Workers Party (United States) presidential nominees
Candidates in the 1980 United States presidential election
20th-century American politicians
1972 United States vice-presidential candidates
Socialist Workers Party (United States) vice presidential nominees
Politicians from Chicago
Socialist Workers Party (United States) politicians from Illinois